Hyeongseop X Euiwoong (Hangul: 형섭x의웅) is a South Korean duo formed by Yuehua Entertainment in Seoul, South Korea. The duo previously participated in Produce 101 Season 2. They debuted on November 2, 2017, with the single "It Will Be Good". The duo debuted in Yuehua's boy group, Tempest on March 2, 2022.

Members
 Ahn Hyeong-seop (안형섭)
 Lee Eui-woong (이의웅)

Discography

Single albums

Singles

Awards and nominations

References

K-pop music groups
South Korean musical duos
South Korean dance music groups
Musical groups from Seoul
Musical groups established in 2017
2017 establishments in South Korea
South Korean boy bands
South Korean pop music groups
Produce 101
Produce 101 contestants
Yuehua Entertainment artists